The 2016–17 Houston Rockets season was the 50th season of the franchise in the National Basketball Association (NBA), and their 46th in the Houston area. On June 1, 2016, the Rockets named Mike D'Antoni as their new head coach. The Rockets retired the number 11 of former center Yao Ming in February 2017.

The Rockets finished the regular season with a 55–27 record, securing the 3rd seed. In the playoffs, the Rockets defeated the Oklahoma City Thunder in five games in the First Round, advancing to the Conference Semi-finals, where they lost in six games to the San Antonio Spurs.

Draft picks

Roster

Standings

Division

Conference

Game log

Preseason

|- style="background:#bfb;"
| 1 || October 2 || Shanghai Sharks
| 
| James Harden (16)
| Clint Capela (11)
| James Harden (10)
| Toyota Center12,313
| 1–0
|- style="background:#bfb;"
| 2 || October 4 || New York
| 
| James Harden (28)
| Anderson, Ariza (7)
| James Harden (11)
| Toyota Center14,397
| 2–0
|- style="background:#bfb;"
| 3 || October 9 || New Orleans
| 
| James Harden (26)
| K. J. McDaniels (8)
| James Harden (15)
| Mercedes-Benz Arena (Shanghai)15,844
| 3–0
|- style="background:#bfb;"
| 4 || October 12 || @ New Orleans
| 
| Bobby Brown (18)
| Ryan Anderson (7)
| James Harden (8)
| LeSports Center (Beijing)14,498
| 4–0
|- style="background:#fbb;"
| 5 || October 15 || Memphis
| 
| Montrezl Harrell (20)
| Harden, Harrell (10)
| James Harden (9)
| Toyota Center14,690
| 4–1
|- style="background:#bfb;"
| 6 || October 19 || @ Dallas
| 
| James Harden (23)
| Clint Capela (13)
| James Harden (11)
| American Airlines Center18,988
| 5–1
|- style="background:#fbb;"
| 7 || October 21 || @ San Antonio
| 
| Bobby Brown (23)
| Montrezl Harrell (8)
| Bobby Brown (9)
| AT&T Center18,418
| 5–2

Regular season

|- style="background:#fbb;"
| 1
| October 26
| @ L.A. Lakers
| 
| James Harden (34)
| Clint Capela (9)
| James Harden (17)
| Staples Center18,997
| 0–1
|- style="background:#bfb;"
| 2
| October 28
| @ Dallas
| 
| Trevor Ariza (27)
| Clint Capela (9)
| James Harden (8)
| American Airlines Center20,163
| 1–1
|- style="background:#bfb;"
| 3
| October 30
| Dallas
| 
| James Harden (28)
| Ryan Anderson (12)
| James Harden (7)
| Toyota Center18,055
| 2–1

|- style="background:#fbb;"
| 4
| November 1
| @ Cleveland
| 
| James Harden (41)
| James Harden (7)
| James Harden (15)
| Quicken Loans Arena20,562
| 2–2
|- style="background:#bfb;"
| 5
| November 2
| @ New York
| 
| James Harden (30)
| Montrezl Harrell (10)
| James Harden (15)
| Madison Square Garden19,812
| 3–2
|- style="background:#fbb;"
| 6
| November 5
| @ Atlanta
| 
| James Harden (30)
| Clint Capela (10)
| James Harden (12)
| Philips Arena16,895
| 3–3
|- style="background:#bfb;"
| 7
| November 7
| @ Washington
| 
| James Harden (32)
| Ryan Anderson (7)
| James Harden (15)
| Verizon Center13,173
| 4–3
|- style="background:#bfb;"
| 8
| November 9
| @ San Antonio
| 
| James Harden (24)
| James Harden (12)
| James Harden (15)
| AT&T Center18,418
| 5–3
|- style="background:#fbb;"
| 9
| November 12
| San Antonio
| 
| Eric Gordon (27)
| James Harden (11)
| James Harden (13)
| Toyota Center18,055
| 5–4
|- style="background:#bfb;"
| 10
| November 14
| Philadelphia
| 
| James Harden (33)
| Clint Capela (13)
| James Harden (9)
| Toyota Center13,183
| 6–4
|- style="background:#fbb;"
| 11
| November 16
| @ Oklahoma City
| 
| Ryan Anderson (14)
| Clint Capela (14)
| James Harden (13)
| Chesapeake Energy Arena18,203
| 6–5
|- style="background:#bfb;"
| 12
| November 17
| Portland
| 
| James Harden (26)
| James Harden (12)
| James Harden (14)
| Toyota Center15,550
| 7–5
|- style="background:#bfb;"
| 13
| November 19
| Utah
| 
| James Harden (31)
| Clint Capela (8)
| James Harden (10)
| Toyota Center14,760
| 8–5
|- style="background:#bfb;"
| 14
| November 21
| @ Detroit
| 
| James Harden (28)
| Clint Capela (12)
| James Harden (11)
| The Palace of Auburn Hills13,632
| 9–5
|- style="background:#fbb;"
| 15
| November 23
| Toronto
| 
| James Harden (29)
| Patrick Beverley (10)
| James Harden (15)
| Toyota Center18,055
| 9–6
|- style="background:#bfb;"
| 16
| November 25
| @ Sacramento
| 
| James Harden (23)
| Capela, Harden (10)
| James Harden (10)
| Golden 1 Center17,608
| 10–6
|- style="background:#bfb;"
| 17
| November 27
| @ Portland
| 
| James Harden (38)
| Clint Capela (9)
| James Harden (10)
| Moda Center19,393
| 11–6
|- style="background:#fbb;"
| 18
| November 29
| @ Utah
| 
| James Harden (26)
| Beverley, Capela, Dekker (6)
| James Harden (7)
| Vivint Smart Home Arena19,911
| 11–7

|- style="background:#bfb;"
| 19
| December 1
| @ Golden State
| 
| Anderson, Harden (29)
| James Harden (15)
| James Harden (13)
| Oracle Arena19,596
| 12–7
|- style="background:#bfb;"
| 20
| December 2
| @ Denver
| 
| James Harden (20)
| Clint Capela (10)
| James Harden (7)
| Pepsi Center15,549
| 13–7
|- style="background:#bfb;"
| 21
| December 5
| Boston
| 
| James Harden (37)
| Clint Capela (9)
| James Harden (8)
| Toyota Center15,730
| 14–7
|- style="background:#bfb;"
| 22
| December 7
| L.A. Lakers
| 
| Eric Gordon (26)
| Clint Capela (9)
| Patrick Beverley (12)
| Toyota Center16,141
| 15–7
|- style="background:#bfb;"
| 23
| December 9
| @ Oklahoma City
| 
| James Harden (21)
| Patrick Beverley (12)
| James Harden (12)
| Chesapeake Energy Arena18,203
| 16–7
|- style="background:#bfb;"
| 24
| December 10
| Dallas
| 
| Gordon, Harden (18)
| Clint Capela (10)
| James Harden (16)
| Toyota Center15,761
| 17–7
|- style="background:#bfb;"
| 25
| December 12
| Brooklyn
| 
| James Harden (36)
| James Harden (8)
| James Harden (11)
| Toyota Center13,619
| 18–7
|- style="background:#bfb;"
| 26
| December 14
| Sacramento
| 
| Ryan Anderson (22)
| James Harden (11)
| James Harden (14)
| Toyota Center15,039
| 19–7
|- style="background:#bfb;"
| 27
| December 16
| New Orleans
| 
| Gordon, Harden (29)
| Beverley, Capela, Harden (11)
| James Harden (13)
| Toyota Center16,728
| 20–7
|- style="background:#bfb;"
| 28
| December 17
| @ Minnesota
| 
| Anderson, Harden (28)
| Patrick Beverley (10)
| James Harden (13)
| Target Center14,689
| 21–7
|- style="background:#fbb;"
| 29
| December 20
| San Antonio
| 
| James Harden (31)
| James Harden (10)
| James Harden (7)
| Toyota Center18,055
| 21–8
|- style="background:#bfb;"
| 30
| December 21
| @ Phoenix
| 
| James Harden (27)
| Patrick Beverley (9)
| James Harden (14)
| Talking Stick Resort Arena18,055
| 22–8
|- style="background:#fbb;"
| 31
| December 23
| @ Memphis
| 
| Ryan Anderson (31)
| Montrezl Harrell (8)
| James Harden (17)
| FedExForum17,454
| 22–9
|- style="background:#bfb;"
| 32
| December 26
| Phoenix
| 
| James Harden (32)
| Trevor Ariza (10)
| James Harden (12)
| Toyota Center18,055
| 23–9
|- style="background:#bfb;"
| 33
| December 27
| @ Dallas
| 
| James Harden (34)
| Sam Dekker (11)
| James Harden (11)
| American Airlines Center20,425
| 24–9
|- style="background:#bfb;"
| 34
| December 30
| L.A. Clippers
| 
| James Harden (30)
| James Harden (13)
| James Harden (10)
| Toyota Center18,055
| 25–9
|- style="background:#bfb;"
| 35
| December 31
| New York
| 
| James Harden (53)
| James Harden (16)
| James Harden (17)
| Toyota Center18,055
| 26–9

|- style="background:#bfb;"
| 36
| January 2
| Washington
| 
| Eric Gordon (31)
| James Harden (10)
| James Harden (10)
| Toyota Center16,569
| 27–9
|- style="background:#bfb;"
| 37
| January 5
| Oklahoma City
| 
| James Harden (26)
| Beverley, Harden, Harrell (8)
| James Harden (12)
| Toyota Center18,055
| 28–9
|- style="background:#bfb;"
| 38
| January 6
| @ Orlando
| 
| Ryan Anderson (19)
| Patrick Beverley (9)
| James Harden (10)
| Amway Center19,272
| 29–9
|- style="background:#bfb;"
| 39
| January 8
| @ Toronto
| 
| James Harden (40)
| James Harden (10)
| James Harden (11)
| Air Canada Centre19,800
| 30–9
|- style="background:#bfb;"
| 40
| January 10
| Charlotte
| 
| James Harden (40)
| James Harden (15)
| James Harden (10)
| Toyota Center16,196
| 31–9
|- style="background:#fbb;"
| 41
| January 11
| @ Minnesota
| 
| James Harden (33)
| Ryan Anderson (7)
| James Harden (12)
| Target Center13,858
| 31–10
|- style="background:#fbb;"
| 42
| January 13
| Memphis
| 
| James Harden (27)
| Trevor Ariza (9)
| James Harden (9)
| Toyota Center18,055
| 31–11
|- style="background:#bfb;"
| 43
| January 15
| @ Brooklyn
| 
| Eric Gordon (24)
| James Harden (11)
| James Harden (11)
| Barclays Center17,732
| 32–11
|- style="background:#fbb;"
| 44
| January 17
| @ Miami
| 
| James Harden (40)
| James Harden (12)
| James Harden (10)
| American Airlines Arena19,600
| 32–12
|- style="background:#bfb;"
| 45
| January 18
| Milwaukee
| 
| James Harden (38)
| Patrick Beverley (9)
| James Harden (8)
| Toyota Center15,782
| 33–12
|- style="background:#fbb;"
| 46
| January 20
| Golden State
| 
| Clint Capela (22)
| Clint Capela (12)
| James Harden (11)
| Toyota Center18,055
| 33–13
|- style="background:#bfb;"
| 47
| January 21
| @ Memphis
| 
| Sam Dekker (30)
| Trevor Ariza (10)
| James Harden (10)
| FedExForum18,119
| 34–13
|- style="background:#fbb;"
| 48
| January 23
| @ Milwaukee
| 
| James Harden (26)
| James Harden (9)
| James Harden (12)
| Bradley Center14,016
| 34–14
|- style="background:#fbb;"
| 49
| January 25
| @ Boston
| 
| James Harden (30)
| Clint Capela (7)
| James Harden (12)
| TD Garden18,624
| 34–15
|- style="background:#bfb;"
| 50
| January 27
| @ Philadelphia
| 
| James Harden (51)
| James Harden (13)
| James Harden (13)
| Wells Fargo Center20,588
| 35–15
|- style="background:#fbb;"
| 51
| January 29
| @ Indiana
| 
| Ryan Anderson (27)
| Trevor Ariza (9)
| James Harden (8)
| Bankers Life Fieldhouse17,923
| 35–16
|- style="background:#bfb;"
| 52
| January 31
| Sacramento
| 
| Ryan Anderson (25)
| Anderson, Capela (11)
| James Harden (8)
| Toyota Center15,187
| 36–16

|- style="background:#fbb;"
| 53
| February 2
| Atlanta
| 
| James Harden (41)
| Clint Capela (9)
| James Harden (8)
| Toyota Center15,602
| 36–17
|- style="background:#bfb;"
| 54
| February 3
| Chicago
| 
| James Harden (42)
| James Harden (12)
| James Harden (9)
| Toyota Center18,055
| 37–17
|- style="background:#bfb;"
| 55
| February 7
| Orlando
| 
| James Harden (25)
| Clint Capela (9)
| James Harden (13)
| Toyota Center15,514
| 38–17
|- style="background:#bfb;"
| 56
| February 9
| @ Charlotte
| 
| James Harden (30)
| James Harden (11)
| James Harden (8)
| Spectrum Center16,270
| 39–17
|- style="background:#bfb;"
| 57
| February 11
| Phoenix
| 
| James Harden (40)
| Patrick Beverley (10)
| James Harden (8)
| Toyota Center18,055
| 40–17
|- style="background:#fbb;"
| 58
| February 15
| Miami
| 
| James Harden (38)
| James Harden (12)
| James Harden (12)
| Toyota Center16,967
| 40–18
|- align="center"
|colspan="9" bgcolor="#bbcaff"|All-Star Break
|- style="background:#bfb;"
| 59
| February 23
| @ New Orleans
| 
| Lou Williams (27)
| Patrick Beverley (12)
| James Harden (14)
| Smoothie King Center18,470
| 41–18
|- style="background:#bfb;"
| 60
| February 25
| Minnesota
| 
| James Harden (24)
| Clint Capela (9)
| James Harden (10)
| Toyota Center18,055
| 42–18
|- style="background:#fbb;"
| 61
| February 27
| Indiana
| 
| Lou Williams (28)
| Capela, Harden (7)
| James Harden (12)
| Toyota Center18,055
| 42–19

|- style="background:#bfb;"
| 62
| March 1
| @ L.A. Clippers
| 
| James Harden (26)
| Beverley, Capela (12)
| James Harden (9)
| Staples Center19,060
| 43–19
|- style="background:#bfb;"
| 63
| March 4
| Memphis
| 
| James Harden (33)
| Clint Capela (11)
| James Harden (11)
| Toyota Center18,055
| 44–19
|- style="background:#fbb;"
| 64
| March 6
| @ San Antonio
| 
| James Harden (39)
| Patrick Beverley (10)
| James Harden (12)
| AT&T Center18,418
| 44–20
|- style="background:#fbb;"
| 65
| March 8
| Utah
| 
| James Harden (35)
| Clint Capela (12)
| James Harden (6)
| Toyota Center16,230
| 44–21
|- style="background:#bfb;"
| 66
| March 10
| @ Chicago
| 
|  Ryan Anderson (21)
| Trevor Ariza (11)
| James Harden (13)
| United Center21,995
| 45–21
|- style="background:#bfb;"
| 67
| March 12
| Cleveland
| 
| James Harden (38)
| Clint Capela (11)
| James Harden (11)
| Toyota Center18,055
| 46–21
|- style="background:#bfb;"
| 68
| March 15
| L.A. Lakers
| 
| Lou Williams (30)
| James Harden (12)
| James Harden (13)
| Toyota Center18,055
| 47–21
|- style="background:#fbb;"
| 69
| March 17
| @ New Orleans
| 
| James Harden (41)
| James Harden (14)
| James Harden (11)
| Smoothie King Center17,972
| 47–22
|- style="background:#bfb;"
| 70
| March 18
| @ Denver
| 
| James Harden (40)
| James Harden (10)
| James Harden (10)
| Pepsi Center17,512
| 48–22
|- style="background:#bfb;"
| 71
| March 20
| Denver
| 
| James Harden (39)
| Clint Capela (9)
| James Harden (11)
| Toyota Center16,080
| 49–22
|- style="background:#bfb;"
| 72
| March 24
| New Orleans
| 
| James Harden (37)
| Clint Capela (13)
| James Harden (17)
| Toyota Center18,055
| 50–22
|- style="background:#bfb;"
| 73
| March 26
| Oklahoma City
| 
| Lou Williams (31)
| Clint Capela (9)
| James Harden (12)
| Toyota Center18,055
| 51–22
|- style="background:#fbb;"
| 74
| March 28
| Golden State
| 
| James Harden (24)
| James Harden (11)
| James Harden (13)
| Toyota Center18,055
| 51–23
|- style="background:#fbb;"
| 75
| March 30
| @ Portland
| 
| James Harden (30)
| Harden, Beverley (8)
| Harden, Nene (4)
| Moda Center20,049
| 51–24
|- style="background:#fbb;"
| 76
| March 31
| @ Golden State
| 
| James Harden (17)
| Clint Capela (14)
| James Harden (8)
| Oracle Arena19,596
| 51–25

|- style="background:#bfb;"
| 77
| April 2
| @ Phoenix
| 
| Patrick Beverley (26)
| Clint Capela (12)
| Patrick Beverley (9)
| Talking Stick Resort Arena17,378
| 52–25
|- style="background:#bfb;"
| 78
| April 5
| Denver
| 
| James Harden (31)
| Beverley, Capela (11)
| James Harden (10)
| Toyota Center18,055
| 53–25
|- style="background:#fbb;"
| 79
| April 7
| Detroit
| 
| James Harden (33)
| Patrick Beverley (13)
| James Harden (12)
| Toyota Center18,055
| 53–26
|- style="background:#bfb;"
| 80
| April 9
| @ Sacramento
| 
| James Harden (35)
| James Harden (11)
| James Harden (15)
| Golden 1 Center17,608
| 54–26
|- style="background:#fbb;"
| 81
| April 10
| @ L.A. Clippers
| 
| Eric Gordon (17)
| Montrezl Harrell (13)
| Bobby Brown (9)
| Staples Center19,060
| 54–27
|- style="background:#bfb;"
| 82
| April 12
| Minnesota
| 
| James Harden (27)
| Beverley, Capela, Harden (10)
| James Harden (12)
| Toyota Center18,055
| 55–27

Playoffs

|- style="background:#bfb;"
| 1
| April 16
| Oklahoma City
| 
| James Harden (37)
| Ryan Anderson (12)
| James Harden (9)
| Toyota Center18,055
| 1–0
|- style="background:#bfb;"
| 2
| April 19
| Oklahoma City
| 
| James Harden (35)
| Clint Capela (10)
| James Harden (8)
| Toyota Center18,055
| 2–0
|- style="background:#fbb;"
| 3
| April 21
| @ Oklahoma City
| 
| James Harden (44)
| Patrick Beverley (7)
| James Harden (6)
| Chesapeake Energy Arena18,203
| 2–1
|- style="background:#bfb;"
| 4
| April 23
| @ Oklahoma City
| 
| Nenê (28)
| Nenê (10)
| James Harden (8)
| Chesapeake Energy Arena18,203
| 3–1
|- style="background:#bfb;"
| 5
| April 25
| Oklahoma City
| 
| James Harden (34)
| Clint Capela (9)
| James Harden (4)
| Toyota Center18,055
| 4–1

|- style="background:#bfb;"
| 1
| May 1
| @ San Antonio
| 
| Trevor Ariza (23)
| Clint Capela (13)
| James Harden (13)
| AT&T Center18,418
| 1–0
|-style ="background:#fbb;"
| 2
| May 3
| @ San Antonio
| 
| Ryan Anderson (18)
| Ryan Anderson (8)
| James Harden (10)
| AT&T Center18,418
| 1–1
|- style="background:#fbb;"
| 3
| May 5
| San Antonio
| 
| James Harden (43)
| Clint Capela (16)
| Ariza, Harden (5)
| Toyota Center18,187
| 1–2
|-style ="background:#bfb;"
| 4
| May 7
| San Antonio
| 
| James Harden (28)
| Clint Capela (9)
| James Harden (12)
| Toyota Center18,055
| 2–2
|- style="background:#fbb;"
| 5
| May 9
| @ San Antonio
| 
| James Harden (33)
| Capela, Harden (11)
| James Harden (10)
| AT&T Center18,418
| 2–3
|- style="background:#fbb;"
| 6
| May 11
| San Antonio
| 
| Trevor Ariza (20)
| Clint Capela (12)
| James Harden (7)
| Toyota Center18,055
| 2–4

Player statistics

Regular season

|- align="center" bgcolor=""
| 
| 72 || 72 || 29.4 || .418 || style=background:#fbb;|.403 || .860 || 4.6 || .9 || .4 || .2 || 13.6
|- align="center" bgcolor="f0f0f0"
| 
| 80 || 80 || 34.7 || .409 || .344 || .738 || 5.7 || 2.2 || style=background:#fbb;|1.8 || .3 || 11.7
|- align="center" bgcolor=""
| 
| 67 || 67 || 30.7 || .420 || .382 || .768 || 5.9 || 4.2 || 1.5 || .4 || 9.5
|- align="center" bgcolor="f0f0f0"
| ‡
| 58 || 8 || 15.9 || .414 || .234 || .727 || 2.0 || 1.1 || .6 || .2 || 4.2
|- align="center" bgcolor=""
| 
| 25 || 0 || 4.9 || .383 || .400 || style=background:#fbb;|1.000 || .2 || .6 || .0 || .0 || 2.5
|- align="center" bgcolor="f0f0f0"
| 
| 65 || 59 || 23.9 || .643 || – || .531 || 8.1 || 1.0 || .5 || style=background:#fbb;|1.2 || 12.6
|- align="center" bgcolor=""
| 
| 77 || 2 || 18.4 || .473 || .321 || .559 || 3.7 || 1.0 || .5 || .3 || 6.5
|- align="center" bgcolor="f0f0f0"
| ‡
| 31 || 0 || 6.3 || .391 || .375 || .667 || .6 || 1.1 || .2 || .0 || 1.9
|- align="center" bgcolor=""
| 
| 75 || 15 || 31.0 || .406 || .372 || .840 || 2.7 || 2.5 || .6 || .5 || 16.2
|- align="center" bgcolor="f0f0f0"
| 
| 81 || 81 || style=background:#fbb;|36.4 || .440 || .347 || .847 || style=background:#fbb;|8.1 || style=background:#fbb;|11.2 || 1.5 || .5 || style=background:#fbb;|29.1
|- align="center" bgcolor=""
| 
| 58 || 14 || 18.3 || .652 || .143 || .628 || 3.8 || 1.1 || .3 || .7 || 9.1
|- align="center" bgcolor="f0f0f0"
| ‡
| 29 || 0 || 7.3 || .456 || .333 || .900 || 1.0 || .1 || .2 || .3 || 2.8
|- align="center" bgcolor=""
| 
| 67 || 8 || 17.9 || .617 || .333 || .589 || 4.2 || 1.0 || .8 || .6 || 9.1
|- align="center" bgcolor="f0f0f0"
| 
| 5 || 1 || 10.4 || style=background:#fbb;|.714 || – || style=background:#fbb;|1.000 || 2.0 || .6 || .6 || .2 || 2.8
|- align="center" bgcolor=""
| 
| 4 || 0 || 13.0 || .143 || .000 || .500 || .8 || .8 || .3 || .3 || .8
|- align="center" bgcolor="f0f0f0"
| 
| 23 || 0 || 25.7 || .386 || .318 || .867 || 3.0 || 2.4 || .7 || .4 || 14.9
|- align="center" bgcolor=""
| 
| 6 || 3 || 23.2 || .500 || .381 || .857 || 4.0 || 1.0 || .5 || .2 || 9.7
|- align="center" bgcolor="f0f0f0"
| 
| 14 || 0 || 3.1 || .286 || .308 || .500 || .7 || .1 || .2 || .1 || .9
|}
‡Traded mid-season

Postseason

|- align="center" bgcolor=""
| 
| 11 || 9 || 30.5 || .391 || .283 || .875 || 5.2 || .6 || .4 || .2 || 9.4
|- align="center" bgcolor="f0f0f0"
| 
| 11 || 11 || style=background:#fbb;|37.5 || .423 || .377 || style=background:#fbb;|.929 || 5.1 || 2.1 || 1.3 || .2 || 10.7
|- align="center" bgcolor=""
| 
| 11 || 11 || 29.5 || .413 || .404 || .786 || 5.5 || 3.0 || 1.5 || .2 || 11.1
|- align="center" bgcolor="f0f0f0"
| 
| 5 || 0 || 4.4 || .500 || .455 || – || .4 || .2 || .0 || .0 || 5.0
|- align="center" bgcolor=""
| 
| 11 || 11 || 26.0 || .561 || .000 || .615 || style=background:#fbb;|8.7 || 1.1 || .7 || style=background:#fbb;|2.5 || 10.5
|- align="center" bgcolor="f0f0f0"
| 
| 4 || 0 || 7.8 || .250 || .500 || – || 2.5 || .3 || .3 || .3 || 2.3
|- align="center" bgcolor=""
| 
| 11 || 2 || 32.5 || .421 || .386 || .722 || 3.9 || 2.0 || .7 || .5 || 12.9
|- align="center" bgcolor="f0f0f0"
| 
| 11 || 11 || 37.0 || .413 || .278 || .878 || 5.5 || style=background:#fbb;|8.5 || style=background:#fbb;|1.9 || .5 || style=background:#fbb;|28.5
|- align="center" bgcolor=""
| 
| 5 || 0 || 4.2 || .333 || – || .500 || 1.2 || .4 || .0 || .0 || 1.0
|- align="center" bgcolor="f0f0f0"
| 
| 9 || 0 || 17.9 || .706 || .000 || .581 || 4.7 || .6 || .7 || .4 || 10.0
|- align="center" bgcolor=""
| 
| 3 || 0 || 3.3 || .000 || .000 || – || .7 || .3 || .0 || .0 || .0
|- align="center" bgcolor="f0f0f0"
| 
| 11 || 0 || 24.7 || .424 || .308 || .897 || 2.7 || 1.3 || .6 || .1 || 12.5
|- align="center" bgcolor=""
| 
| 5 || 0 || 3.8 || .000 || .000 || .500 || 1.4 || .2 || .0 || .0 || .2
|- align="center" bgcolor="f0f0f0"
| 
| 1 || 0 || 5.0 || style=background:#fbb;|1.000 || style=background:#fbb;|1.000 || – || .0 || .0 || .0 || .0 || 3.0
|}

Injuries

Source:

Transactions

Trades

Free agents
Re-signed

Additions

Subtractions

Awards, records and milestones

Awards

Records
 On November 12, James Harden became the first player in NBA history to record at least 24 points & 12 assists in six consecutive games.
 On November 14, James Harden became the first player in NBA history to record 300+ points and 120+ assists in their team's first 10 games.
 On November 25, the Rockets attempted 50 three-pointers in a win against the Kings, setting an NBA record for most 3-pointers attempted in a game, breaking the previous record of 49 set by Dallas in 1996.
 On November 29, the Rockets hit 10+ three-pointers in their 17th consecutive game, setting an NBA record. The streak would last until December 20, ending at 27 straight games.
 On December 7, Eric Gordon made eight 3-pointers in a 134–95 win against the Los Angeles Lakers, the most 3's made by a player coming off the bench in franchise history.
 On December 16, the Rockets made 24 three-pointers on 61 attempts in a win against the Pelicans, both setting an NBA record.
 On December 31, James Harden recorded 53 points along with 16 rebounds and 17 assists, becoming the first player to record a 50–15–15 game in NBA history, and tying Wilt Chamberlain for most points scored in a triple-double. It was a new career high in points for Harden as well as tying his career high in assists. The 53 points scored by Harden set a new record for the most points scored on New Year's Eve in NBA history.
 The Rockets went 15–2 in the month of December, tying their franchise record for most wins in a calendar month (November 1996).
 The Rockets made 279 three-pointers in December, shattering the old NBA record of 227 for most 3's made in a single month.
 The Rockets became the first team since the Golden State Warriors in March 1992 to score 2,000 points in a single calendar month.
 On January 2, James Harden became the first Rocket to record three straight triple-doubles.
 On January 6, James Harden's streak of 53 straight games of making a three-pointer came to an end against the Magic, a franchise record for most consecutive games with a 3-pointer.
 On January 10, James Harden became just the fourth player in NBA history record a 40-point triple-double in consecutive games.
 On January 27, James Harden recorded a 51-point, 13 rebound, 13 assist triple-double, becoming the first player in NBA history to record two 50-point triple-doubles in the same season, and tying Oscar Robertson for the most 40-point triple-doubles in a single season with five.
 On March 1, the Rockets scored 100+ points in their 48th consecutive game, setting a franchise record.
 On March 4, Eric Gordon made his 180th three-pointer this season as a reserve, setting an NBA record for most three-pointers made by a player off the bench in a season.

Milestones
 On November 9, James Harden passed Vernon Maxwell for most 3-point attempts in Rockets history with 2,242.
 On November 19, James Harden passed Robert Reid for 7th on the Rockets' all-time scoring list.
 On December 2, James Harden became the first Rocket to make a 3-pointer in each of the first 20 games of the season.
 On December 10, Trevor Ariza passed Shane Battier for 4th all-time in Rockets' history in 3-pointers made with 780.
 On December 14, James Harden recorded his 14th career triple-double as a Rocket, tying Hakeem Olajuwon for most in franchise history. Harden would pass Olajuwon by recording his 15th in his very next game against the Pelicans.
 On December 20, James Harden passed Yao Ming for 6th on the Rockets' all-time scoring list with 9,248 points.
 On December 26, James Harden passed Kenny Smith for 5th all-time in franchise history for assists with 2,459.
 On January 15, James Harden passed Mike Newlin for 4th place all-time in Rockets' history in assists with 2,582.
 On January 27, James Harden passed Steve Francis for 5th all-time in franchise history in steals with 920.
 On February 3, James Harden scored his 10,000th career point as a Rocket, becoming just the sixth Rocket ever to reach that milestone for the franchise.

References

Houston Rockets seasons
Houston Rockets
Houston Rockets
Houston Rockets